Austropetalia annaliese is a species of dragonfly of the family Austropetaliidae, known as the northern redspot. 
It is endemic to mountain areas of north-eastern New South Wales, Australia, where sphagnum moss is abundant.
It is a medium-sized dragonfly with brown and yellow markings, the female being similar to both Austropetalia patricia and Austropetalia tonyana.

See also
 List of Odonata species of Australia

References

Austropetaliidae
Odonata of Australia
Insects of Australia
Endemic fauna of Australia
Taxa named by Günther Theischinger
Insects described in 2013